Zwiefalten Abbey ( or after 1750) is a former Benedictine monastery situated at Zwiefalten near Reutlingen in Baden-Württemberg in Germany.

History 
The monastery was founded in 1089 at the time of the Investiture Controversy by Counts Gero and Kuno of Achalm, advised by Bishop Adalbero of Würzburg and Abbot William of Hirsau. The first monks were also from Hirsau Abbey, home of the Hirsau Reforms (under the influence of the Cluniac reforms), which strongly influenced the new foundation. Noker von Zwiefalten was the first abbot and led from 1065–90.

The monk Ortlieb wrote a history of the monastery in the early 12th century. Berthold continued it to 1137–38. He served as abbot in 1139–1141, 1146/7–1152/6 and 1158–1169.

During the 12th century Saint Ernest (died 1148) was abbot. Between 1145 and 1149 he participated in the Second Crusade to regain the Holy Lands including Jerusalem.

Although Pope Urban VI granted special privileges to it, Zwiefalten Abbey was nevertheless the private monastery of the Counts of Achalm, later succeeded by the Counts of Württemberg.

The abbey was plundered in 1525 during the German Peasants' War.

Christoph Rassler was abbot from 1658–75 and Augustin Stegmüller was abbot in the 18th century.

In 1750 the abbey was granted the status of Reichsabtei, which meant that it had the status of an independent power subject only to the Imperial Crown and was free of the rule of Württemberg.

On 25 November 1802, however, it was secularised and dissolved and became a lunatic asylum and later psychiatric hospital, which it is today, as well as the site of the Württemberg Psychiatry Museum.

Buildings 
The present buildings were constructed in German Baroque style from 1739–47 under the direction of Johann Michael Fischer (1692–1766) of Munich, who began overseeing the work in 1741. The interior, considered a model of Baroque design, is filled with ornate chapels and gilded balustrades, dominated by the high altar, which combines a Gothic statue of the Virgin Mary dating from 1430 with Baroque additions (dating from about 1750) by Johann Joseph Christian (1706–77). The elaborate frescoes are by Franz Joseph Spiegler (1691–1757).

Gallery

References 

Benedictine monasteries in Germany
Psychiatric hospitals in Germany
Monasteries in Baden-Württemberg
1089 establishments in Europe
Christian monasteries established in the 11th century
Hospitals established in 1802
Imperial abbeys disestablished in 1802–03
Swabian Jura
Medical and health organisations based in Baden-Württemberg
Reutlingen (district)